Liège is a city in Belgium.

Liège or Liege may also refer to:

 Liege, a feudal relationship between lord and vassal; see Homage (feudal)

Other places

Places within Belgium 
 Liège (province), a province of Belgium
 Arrondissement of Liège, an administrative and judicial subdivision
 Roman Catholic Diocese of Liège, a Roman Catholic Diocese coextensive with the province
 Prince-Bishopric of Liège, a former state of the Holy Roman Empire in the Low Countries
 Republic of Liège, a short-lived, unrecognized state (1789–1791) centered on Liège, Belgium

Outside of Belgium 
 Le Liège, a commune in central France
 Liège Island, in the Antarctic

Transportation
 Liège (car), automobile inspired by the 1950s classic sporting car era
 Liège Airport, the airport of the city of Liège
 Liège (Paris Métro), a subway station in Paris

Military
 Battle of Liège, the first battle of World War I
 Liège Medal, an unofficial World War I campaign medal issued by the Belgian city of Liège

Other uses
 RFC Liège, a Belgian football club
 University of Liège, a major public university

People
 Stephen of Liège (c. 850–920), bishop, writer and musician
 Alger of Liège (1055–1131), clergyman and writer
 Jacques de Liège (died after 1330), or Iacobus de Ispania, musician
 Jean de Liège (c. 1330–1381), sculptor
 Liege Hulett (1838–1928) South African sugar magnate and philanthropist

See also
 Liege lord (disambiguation)
 Liégeois, an eastern form of the Walloon language